Rugby India, also known as Indian Rugby Football Union is the governing body for sport of rugby union in India. It is situated at Marine lines, Mumbai in Maharashtra.

It was founded in 1968 and became affiliated to the International Rugby Board now World Rugby in 1999.

Rugby India administers all India national teams such as India men's national rugby union team, India women's national rugby union team teams, India women's national rugby sevens team and India national rugby seven team. It also manage under-20 national teams for both sexes.

History 

Rugby Union in India dates back to a scratch match or two played in Kolkata and Madras during the visit of MS Galatea in 1871. The first recorded match was played on Christmas Day 1872, at CFC Ground in Kolkata, it was played between England and a combined team of Scotland, Ireland and Wales. 

In 1968 the India Rugby Football Union was founded and in 1999 the IFRU gained association from the International Rugby Board. 
In March 2019, former Sourh African player Naas Botha became coach of national team. He accepted the job for short term.
  
Rugby India (RI) organised Asian  under 18 tournament in 2018 at Kalinga Stadium, Bhubaneswar. In the tournament 14 nations participated and India finished on 4th position. 
Rugby India was founded in 1998. It is sole governing body for rugby in India. It is recognised by Sports ministry of India and affiliated to the World Rugby, the international governing body of the sport in the world.

Coaches
 Naas Botha- coach, a former South African national player 
 Ludwiche Van Deventer - Rugby 7 specialist
 Jannie Brooks (strength and conditioning coach) 
 Vahbiz Bharucha - mentor, psychotherapist for under 18 female team. 
Source -

Sponsors
 Government of Odisha
 Société Générale, a financial partner and official bank
 Capgemini - Associate sponsor India Rugby seven teams  
 BLK (sportswear) - apparel sponsor 
 BLADE India - National team partner 
 Abhinav Bindra Targeting Performance (ABTP) - Official partner 
 Refs-

See also

 History of rugby union 
 Sport in India
 All India & South Asia Rugby Tournament

References

External links
 The Official Website of Rugby India 

Rugby union in India
Sports governing bodies in India 
 Organisations based in Maharashtra
Rugby union governing bodies in Asia
Sports organizations established in 1968
1968 establishments in Maharashtra
Organisations based in Mumbai